Nickelodeon Games and Sports for Kids (stylized as Nick GaS and commonly known as Nick GAS) was an American cable television network that was part of MTV Networks' suite of digital cable channels. The channel was available to all digital cable providers and satellite provider Dish Network. With its focus on classic Nickelodeon game shows (most of which had been removed from the parent network between 1999–2002), Nick GAS was essentially a children's version of (and Viacom's answer to) Game Show Network, which launched on December 1, 1994.

The VP/General Manager of the network was Nickelodeon executive Mark Offitzer, producer of numerous Nick specials including the Kids Choice Awards. Summer Sanders was named on-air Commissioner of the network; Dave Aizer (1999–2003) and Vivianne Collins (1999–2003) were the network's original on-air hosts, with Mati Moralejo (2001–05) joining soon after and later on Nadine (2004) and George (2004) separately during commercials.

History
Nickelodeon Games and Sports for Kids (or Nickelodeon GAS) was announced on November 3, 1998. The channel had been in development for months as Nickelodeon conducted research among children to determine their sports-related interests.

Nick GAS launched on March 1, 1999. Olympic skater Tara Lipinski joined the new network as a special host and sports correspondent. Upon launch, Nick GAS reached less than a million of the 70 million-plus cable and satellite subscribers in the U.S. However, it soon became one of the most sought-after channels among cable operators. Its programming primarily consisted of children's game shows and sports-related programs from parent network Nickelodeon.

Nick GAS also produced its own original programming, such as Play to Z, Gamefarm and Splash TV. GAS also featured original blocks Camp GAS during the summer, Double Dare Double Play (both removed in 2004), and Pumping GAS (removed in 2005).

In place of commercials, Nick GAS aired interstitial segments, some of which were produced at Nickelodeon on Sunset and the defunct Nickelodeon Studios at Universal Studios Florida, promos for Nick GAS original programming, aired during commercial breaks. However, in-show advertising (like consolation and grand prizes of the network's shows) were left intact, as it was part of the show itself.

The studio segments in the "GAS Garage" often included competitions between families, or interviews with athletes and other celebrities. Programs were usually grouped together in the blocks Heads Up!, Wild Card, Family Fuel, Extreme GAS (all removed in 2002) and aired during commercial breaks. Other interstitials included "Heroes of the Game", "GAS Grill", "Trade Tricks", "Time Out", T.U.M.E.G., "Skill Drill", "MLS Play of the Week", "Global GAS", "Home Turf Highlights", "Let's Just Play ads", "In Play Today", "All Access", "FastBreak", "GasCaster Report", and in the early years of the network "This Day in History".

From October 31, 2005 onwards, Nick GAS's programming was fully automated, putting seven shows on a permanent timeslot (GUTS, Legends of the Hidden Temple, Figure It Out, Get the Picture, Double Dare 2000, Nick Arcade and Finders Keepers) and regular segments. In September 2006, Finders Keepers was removed from the network, leaving only six shows on the channel by its last years.

Shutdown
On August 13, 2007, Viacom announced that Nick GAS would shut down at the end of the year. It was replaced by a 24-hour version of Noggin's teen-oriented block The N, which started airing on Noggin in mid-2002.

On December 31, 2007, Nick GAS officially closed at 6:00 a.m. Eastern Time, after an episode of Figure It Out. Two bumpers were briefly aired afterwards, the second one being interrupted by The N's programming stream, which aired Instant Star at the time of the transition. The N's separate channel was subsequently replaced by TeenNick on September 28, 2009.

Dish Network retained an automated loop of Nick GAS on the air for 15 months, continuing to maintain the split of Noggin/The N manually on its existing channel slot. On April 23, 2009, Dish announced it would remove Nick GAS and replace it with the Pacific feed of Cartoon Network the following day, and it ended at 3:30 a.m. ET after an episode of Legends of the Hidden Temple before switching to the Pacific feed of Adult Swim in progress. Both Noggin and The N finally acquired their own 24/7 Dish channels weeks later, in time for the announced rebranding of both networks (though a 24-hour feed of The N had launched separately on channel 9476 the previous November, perhaps as a test run; following the move of the CN feed, said feed would move into the old CN channel slot).

Pluto TV revival as NickGames
On November 19, 2019, Viacom announced the addition of several new networks to its Pluto TV video streaming service, including a new network called NickGames. The network featured much of the older Nickelodeon game show programming carried by Nick GAS, along with newer Nickelodeon competition and reality programming produced after Nick GAS's demise.

On August 18, 2020, NickGames was removed from the Pluto TV lineup and the programming moved to various channels.

Programs

Most of the programming on GAS consisted of past Nickelodeon game shows, making up a library of 1,000 hours. Such programs included Double Dare, Nickelodeon Guts, Figure It Out, Wild & Crazy Kids, and Sports Theater starring Shaquille O'Neal. The network also produced a sitcom, Renford Rejects, and purchased episodes of SI for Kids, which originally aired on CBS.

In its early years, Nick GAS signed deals with several sports associations which would provide exclusive game coverage and short features. Nick GAS also aired non-game programming such as Salute Your Shorts, Speed Racer X, Scaredy Camp, and Rocket Power (all of which mainly involved extreme sports and competition).

The network also aired a one-hour block of video game programming on Saturday nights from 2003–04. Play to Z (mainly re-purposed content from the UK-based Game Network) and Nickelodeon Gamefarm (an original series featuring video game news and competitions) aired during this time. Nick GAS also acquired reruns of Nickelodeon Robot Wars, a program adapted from the UK original.

References

Commercial-free television networks
Defunct television networks in the United States
English-language television stations in the United States
g
Television channels and stations established in 1998
Television channels and stations disestablished in 2007
Television channels and stations disestablished in 2009